The Bath Philharmonia is an orchestra based in Bath.

Jason Thornton is the orchestra's Artistic Director

Background
Bath Philharmonia is one of the leading professional orchestras in the South-West of England.

Discography
Paul Carr: Requiem For An Angel (with Sophie Bevan - soprano, Mark Stone - baritone, Chorus Angelorum, Gavin Carr - conductor), Stone Records (2010)

References
Bath Philharmonia website

English orchestras